Emory Arthur Rounds III is an American attorney and government ethics official who is the current Director of the United States Office of Government Ethics, nominated by President Donald Trump to serve a five-year term.

Career
Rounds served as an ethics attorney at the United States Department of Commerce and in the Judge Advocate General's Office in the U.S. Navy, where he attained the rank of Commander.
Rounds served as an ethics counsel for six years in the White House Counsel's Office during the administration of George W. Bush, and subsequently served as an associate counsel at the U.S. Office of Government Ethics.

On February 8, 2018, President Donald Trump announced his intent to nominate Rounds to the office of Director of the Office of Government Ethics for a term of five years.  On August 7, 2018, Rounds made the following statement as newly appointed Director of the U.S. Office of Government Ethics:  "I am honored to lead the Office of Government Ethics.  I am also deeply humbled by the weight of this agency’s mission.  The U.S. Office of Government Ethics will continue to ensure that the citizens of our nation can help ensure their leaders are complying with ethics laws and rules. The agency will continue to make ethics documents available and communicate with the public to make sure that the people’s business is conducted with all appropriate transparency."

Personal life

Rounds is a graduate of King Philip Regional High School, in Wrentham, Massachusetts. He earned his BA in English from the University of Massachusetts Amherst, and his Juris Doctor from the University of Akron. He is married with five children, and is a resident of southern Maine - a state he always desired to return to following a tour stationed at Brunswick Naval Air Station during the 1980s. Rounds is a great fan of New England sports franchises, especially the New England Patriots and the Boston Red Sox.

References

Living people
Trump administration personnel
University of Massachusetts Amherst alumni
American military lawyers
University of Akron alumni
Year of birth missing (living people)